Christopher Scott Mooney (born August 7, 1972) is an American college basketball coach and the current head men's basketball coach at the University of Richmond. Prior to taking the helm of the Spiders basketball program, he was the head coach at Air Force. In his only year there, he led the Falcons to their second best record in school history (18–12). He played college basketball at Princeton. As a four-year starter at Princeton, he ranks 22nd on the school's all-time leading scoring list with 1,071 points, and 11th in three-point field goals made (142).

Early years and college
Mooney was born and raised in working-class neighborhood in Philadelphia, spending his high school years at Archbishop Ryan High School as the child of a single father after his mother died from breast cancer when he was 13 years old.  Mooney's father was a Greyhound bus driver.

In 1990, Mooney enrolled at Princeton University, majoring in English and playing basketball for legendary coach Pete Carril.  Mooney was a four-year starter at Princeton, starting all 107 games in his career and amassing 1,071 points, good for 20th place in program history. He finished second for Rookie of the Year  in the Ivy League as a freshman and received honorable mention all-conference honors as a sophomore, First Team All-Ivy League honors as a junior and Second Team All-Ivy League honors in his senior year.

Coaching career
Mooney began his coaching career fresh out of college at Lansdale Catholic High School in Lansdale, Pennsylvania.  In 1998, Mooney took the helm of the program at Beaver College, now known as Arcadia University.  After two years at Beaver, Mooney took an assistant coaching position under Joe Scott at the United States Air Force Academy.  When Scott left to take the head coaching position at Princeton University in 2004, Mooney was elevated to the head position at Air Force.  After one season at Air Force, Mooney became head coach at the University of Richmond.

The University of Richmond announced on March 27, 2011, following a run to the Sweet Sixteen in the 2011 NCAA Division I men's basketball tournament that Mooney had signed a new contract running through the 2020–21 season.

With an 84–74 win over Wake Forest on December 1, 2018; Mooney tallied his 240th win at Richmond, vaulting him past Dick Tarrant to become the winningest coach in Richmond history.

On February 17, 2023, Richmond announced that Mooney would miss the remainder of the 2022–23 season due to heart surgery to address an aneurysm in his ascending aorta. Assistant coach and former Richmond player Peter Thomas will serve as interim head coach in Mooney's absence.

Head coaching record

College

References

External links
 Richmond profile

1972 births
Living people
Air Force Falcons men's basketball coaches
American men's basketball coaches
American men's basketball players
Arcadia Knights men's basketball coaches
Basketball coaches from Pennsylvania
Basketball players from Philadelphia
College men's basketball head coaches in the United States
High school basketball coaches in the United States
Princeton Tigers men's basketball players
Richmond Spiders men's basketball coaches